Charles Lindsay Workman (March 6, 1924 – April 24, 2012) was a character and voice actor who had a career in film and television that started in the 1950s and continued until the early 1990s. He has over 100 credits, and was often credited as Lindsay Workman.

Background
A familiar face to viewers, Workman was a prolific character actor whose busiest time was during the 1960s and 1970s where he had dozens of guest roles in television series'. He was also a voice actor and his work included Garfield and Mercedes Benz where he provided the distinguished voice for their commercials.

He grew up in Pittsburgh, Pennsylvania. While still a child, he got his introduction to radio. He attended Pomona College and Yale University and there he studied literature and acting. During the 1950s, he was a member of the Scripps College theater department faculty. A family man, he was married and was the father of two children. He had also been active member of the Pacific Pioneer Broadcasters, something that meant a lot to him. He did community volunteering work for the Boy Scouts in the Los Angeles Area Council, and received awards for his service.

Career
One of his earliest roles was in the television series, Blondie, playing the part of  Mr. Knapp in the episode "Howdy Neighbor" in 1957. Also that year, he appeared in the series Sergeant Preston of the Yukon,

In the late 1960s, he had a recurring role as Reverend Adams in Here Come the Brides.
(TV)ADAM 12-minister
[1973] “ RAMPART division-S6:E2
During the 1970s, he had a recurring role in the series Julia as Otto Brockmeyer.

He had a part in the  Paul Wendkos made-for-television film, The Five of Me which was released in 1981.

His last credit appears to be as Dr. Roger Furney in "Episode #1.4813" of The Young and the Restless.

Death
He died on April 24, 2012 in Claremont, California at the age of 88 following a short illness.

Filmography

References

External links
 
 Ultimate70s.com: 1970-1982 TV show guest appearances for C. Lindsay Workman

1924 births
2012 deaths
20th-century American male actors
American male film actors
American male voice actors
American male television actors